Titusville is a hamlet and census-designated place in the town of LaGrange, New York, in Dutchess County, United States. As of the 2010 census, it had a population of 811.

Geography

It is bordered to the south by the hamlet of Red Oaks Mill.

Demographics

References

Geography of Dutchess County, New York
Census-designated places in New York (state)
Hamlets in New York (state)